The Platinum Collection is the first greatest hits collection of American singer Laura Branigan that was released posthumously. It was released only in the United Kingdom and Brazil on July 24, 2006, however is available as an import in other regions. The album is part of the Warner Platinum series released by Rhino Records.

Track listing

References

2006 greatest hits albums
Laura Branigan albums
Albums produced by David Kershenbaum
Compilation albums published posthumously